Raymund Brachmann (7 June 1872 – 6 March 1953) was a German architect, who created several highly regarded buildings of Jugendstil and reform architecture in Leipzig between 1900 and the First World War.

Life 
Born in Leipzig, Brachmann was the son of a Amtsgerichtsrat in Leipzig. After his father's early death, he studied architecture at the Technical University of Dresden.

The merchant Max Haunstein, a relative of Brachmann's wife, commissioned him to design a villa as a wedding gift for his wife. The house at Liviastrasse 8 in Leipzig, whose spatial concept was based on the position of the sun in the course of the day, was designed by Paul Horst-Schulze. It had a drinking fountain in the salon, a dumbwaiter and a luxurious bathroom. Enthused by the result, Haunstein subsequently provided Brachmann with the money for several residential buildings in Leibnizstraße.

Brachmann's main work is considered to be the very expensive so-called , built in 1906/1907 in valuable materials, with portraits of Leipzig personalities designed by Johannes Hartmann at the Platz am Künstlerhaus (since 1922 . On 4 December 1943, this important example of Leipzig's Art Nouveau architecture was destroyed.

Brachmann also worked with the renowned Munich . He was a member of the Association of German Architects and the Leipziger Künstlerbund. Together with Paul Horst-Schulze, he participated in the 3rd German Arts and Crafts Exhibition in Dresden in 1906 on behalf of the Leipziger Künstlerbund. As early as 1907, Brachmann became a member of the Deutscher Werkbund, which had only been founded in the same year.

Brachmann died in Leipzig at the age of 80.

Realisations

In Leipzig 
 1901–1904: Villa für den Kaufmann Max Haunstein, Liviastraße 8
 1905: Wohnhaus Leibnizstraße 23 (war-destroyed)
 1905: Wohnhaus Leibnizstraße 25
 1905: Wohnhaus Leibnizstraße 27 (zu DDR-Zeiten Sitz des Kreisjugendarztes)
 1906/1907: Märchenhaus, Platz am Künstlerhaus (since 1922 Nikischplatz; war-destroyed)
 1907–1909: Umbau des Stadtpalais des Pelzhändlers Friedrich Wilhelm Dodel, Leibnizstraße 26/28 (erbaut 1862 von Otto Klemm, erweitert von Heinrich Purfürst; zu DDR-Zeiten Haus der Jungen Pioniere Georg Schwarz)
 1909–1915: Closed row of detached houses, Windscheidstraße 28, 30, 32, 34 (severely affected by later alterations and partial demolition of the head buildings.)
 1911: Villa für den Kaufmann Theodor Hartmann, Windscheidstraße 22

In other locations 
 1918: Cemetery grove of honour for soldiers killed in the First World War Püchau

Publications 
 Das ländliche Arbeiterwohnhaus. Baureife Entwürfe für Landarbeiterwohnhäuser mit Stall im Preise von 3500–5000 Mark. (Hervorgegangen aus dem Wettbewerbe der Landwirtschaftlichen Sonder-Ausstellung der Internationalen Baufachausstellung Leipzig 1913). Verlag der Gesellschaft für Heimkultur, Wiesbaden 1913.

Further reading 
 Bernd Sikora, Peter Franke: Das Leipziger Waldstraßenviertel. Straßen, Häuser und Bewohner. Edition Leipzig, Leipzig 2012, .
 Peter Guth, Bernd Sikora: Jugendstil und Werkkunst. Architektur um 1900 in Leipzig. Edition Leipzig, Leipzig 2005, .
 Andreas Höhn: Künstlerfreund und Baumeister des Großbürgertums. Der Werkbund-Architekt Raymund Brachmann. In Leipziger Blätter. Jahrgang 2004, issue 45, .

References

External links 
 

Art Nouveau architects
20th-century German architects
1872 births
1953 deaths
Architects from Leipzig